The Biñan–Muntinlupa Transmission Line (abbreviated as 8LI1BIN-MUN, 8LI2BIN-MUN, 8LI3BIN-MUN, 8LI4BIN-MUN) is a 230,000 volt, quadruple-circuit transmission line in Laguna and Metro Manila, Philippines that connects Biñan and Muntinlupa substations of National Grid Corporation of the Philippines (NGCP).

Route description

Lines 1 and 2

Lines 1 and 2 of the transmission line, mostly consists of lattice towers with steel poles on certain portions, was originally commissioned by the government-owned National Power Corporation (NAPOCOR), and are located within the service area of National Grid Corporation of the Philippines (NGCP) South Luzon Operations and Maintenance (SLOM) Districts 1 (South Western Tagalog) and 2 (South Eastern Tagalog; along with lines 3 and 4). The power line crosses into PNR Metro Commuter Line, Metro Manila Skyway, and South Luzon Expressway (SLEx). It turns left, passes into residential areas, establishments, and institutions within Muntinlupa, and crosses into Don Jesus Boulevard, South Station Transport Terminal, and Alabang Viaduct.

Near the viaduct is tower 34 that collapsed last April 19, 2017 due to a fire caused by informal settlers living under the tower. It was later removed and retired, and replaced with a new double-circuit steel pole located at Highway Homes Subdivision. Bipole tower 34A is located where NAPOCOR-era lattice tower 34 was once located, with steel poles 34B and 34C which are also double-circuit poles are located along the western side of Alabang Viaduct.

The transmission line then continues straightforward, passes into Susana Heights Exit, enters Laguna upon crossing Tunasan River, passes into San Pedro and Biñan, and ends at Biñan Substation.

Lines 3 and 4
Lines 3 and 4, which consists of steel poles, utilize both sides of PNR Metro Commuter Line from Muntinlupa to Biñan. Before ending at Biñan Substation, it turns right and passes into Forest Lake Memorial Park.

Statistics
The transmission line consists of 167 steel poles, 51 lattice towers, and 1 H-frame with a total of 219 transmission structures.

Expansion and improvements

On June 27, 2010, privately-owned National Grid Corporation of the Philippines (NGCP) completed line 4 of the transmission line.

Due to the construction of Skyway Stage 2, NGCP constructed bipole 47A located near Skyway and SLEx.

New steel poles 34, 34B, and 34C and bipole tower 34A were constructed due to the construction of Skyway Extension, with NAPOCOR-era lattice tower 34 was removed and retired.

Notes

References

Transmission lines in the Philippines